The National Commission on Farmers (NCF) is an Indian commission constituted on 18 November 2004 under the chairmanship of Professor M.S. Swaminathan to address the nationwide calamity of farmers suicides in India. The Terms of Reference reflected the priorities listed in the Common Minimum Programme. The NCF submitted four reports in December 2004, August 2005, December 2005 and April 2006 respectively. The fifth and final report was submitted on 4 October 2006.  The reports contain suggestions to achieve the goal of "faster and more inclusive growth" as envisaged in the Approach to 11th Five Year Plan and are collectively termed the M.S. Swaminathan report for farmers

The final report of the Commission was focused on causes of farmer distress and the rise in farmer suicides in India and recommended addressing them through a holistic national policy for farmers 

The key recommendations from the Commission incorporated in Revised Draft National Policy for Farmers include asset reforms covering land, water, livestock, and bioresources farmer-friendly support services; and curriculum reforms in the agriculture universities

Composition
The composition of the reconstituted National Commission on Farmers is as under: 
 Chairman – M.S. Swaminathan
 Full-time Members – Ram Badan Singh, Y.C. Nanda
 Part-time Members – R. L. Pitale, Jagadish Pradhan, Chanda Nimbkar, Atul Kumar Anjan
 Member Secretary – Atul Sinha

Terms of reference
 Work out a comprehensive medium-term strategy for food and nutrition security .
 Propose methods of enhancing the productivity, profitability, stability, and sustainability of the major farming systems
 Bring about the synergy between technology and public policy
 Suggest measures to attract and retain educated youth in farming
 Suggest policy reforms designed to enhance investment in Agricultural Research, increase the flow of rural credit to farmers
 Formulate special programs for dryland farming
 Suggest measures for enhancing the quality and cost competitiveness of farm commodities
 Recommend measures for the credit, knowledge, skill, technological and marketing empowerment of women
 Suggest methods of empowering members of elected local bodies to discharge their role in conserving and improving the ecological foundations for sustainable agriculture effectively

Implementation 

Its implementation is not done yet due to lack of funds by government in these suggestions.

Further reading

References

Indian commissions and inquiries
Agricultural organisations based in India
Indian farmers
2004 establishments in India
Government agencies established in 2004